Cavalli is an Italian surname, literally meaning "horses", and may refer to:

Aldo Cavalli (born 1946), Italian bishop
Cade Cavalli (born 1998), American baseball player
Francesco Cavalli (1602-1676), Italian 17th-century composer
Hans Cavalli-Björkman (1928-2020), Swedish businessman
Jean-Michel Cavalli (born 1957), French football player
Johan Cavalli (born 1981), French footballer
Luigi Luca Cavalli-Sforza (1922-2018), population geneticist
Olimpia Cavalli (1930-2012), Italian actress
Roberto Cavalli (born 1940), Italian fashion designer
Simone Cavalli (born 1979), Italian footballer
Valeria Cavalli (born 1959), Italian actress

See also
Cavalli, also known as Horses, a 2011 Italian film

Italian-language surnames